S. N. Balagangadhara (aka Balu) is a professor emeritus of the Ghent University in Belgium, and was director of the India Platform and the Research Centre Vergelijkende Cutuurwetenschap (Comparative Science of Cultures).

Early life and education 
Balagangadhara was a student of National College, Bangalore and moved to Belgium in 1977 to study philosophy at Ghent University, where he obtained his doctorate under the supervision of Etienne Vermeersch. His doctoral thesis (1991) was entitled Comparative Science of Cultures and the Universality of Religion: An Essay on Worlds without Views and Views without the World.

Career 
Balagangadhara's research centers on the comparative study of Western culture against the background of Indian culture; the program has been named "Vergelijkende Cultuurwetenschap / Comparative Science of Cultures". He analyses western culture and intellectual thought through its representations of other cultures, with a particular focus on the western representations of India and attempts to translate the knowledge embodied by the Indian traditions into western conceptual frameworks.

Works and reception 
His first monograph was The Heathen in his Blindness... (1994, BRILL). 

His second major work, Reconceptualizing India Studies, appeared in 2012 and argues that post-colonial studies and modern India studies are in need of a rejuvenation.

Honors 
He has held the co-chair of the Hinduism Unit at the American Academy of Religion (AAR) from 2004 to 2007. On 1 October 2013, University of Pardubice (Czech Republic) awarded him with its honorary doctorate for: (a) the outstanding development of the comparative science of cultures and religions, (b) the development of the collaborations between European and Indian universities, and (c) his contribution to the development of the Studies of religions at the University Faculty of Arts and Philosophy.

Projects

The development of the Centre for the Study of Local Cultures (CSLC) at Kuvempu University, India.
The Academy of Social Sciences and Humanities (ĀSHA).
The five-year Rethinking Religion in India conference cluster.

Selected publications

Books

Cultures Differ Differently: Selected Essays of S.N. Balagangadhara. Edited by Jakob De Roover and Sarika Rao. London and New York: Routledge.
Balagangadhara, S. N.; Rao, Sarika (2021). What Does It Mean to be 'Indian'? Chennai: Indic Academy and Notion Press.
 | (Second, revised edition, New Delhi, Manohar, 2005) | Preview at Google Books | Find in libraries near you

 | 

 |

Book chapters
Balagangadhara, S. N. & Claerhout, Sarah (2014) "De antieken en het vroege christendom: een heidense visie uit India" in D. Praet & N. Grillaert (Eds.), Christendom en Filosofie. Gent: Academia Press, pp. 51–82
Balagangadhara, S. N. & De Roover, Jakob (2012) "The Dark Hour of Secularism: Hindu Fundamentalism and Colonial Liberalism in India" in R. Ghosh (Ed.), Making Sense of the Secular: Critical Perspectives from Europe to Asia. New York: Routledge, pp. 111–130
Balagangadhara, S. N. (2010) "Orientalism, Postcolonialism, and the 'Construction' of Religion" in Bloch, Keppens & Hegde (Eds.), Rethinking Religion in India: The Colonial Construction of Hinduism. New York: Routledge, pp. 135–163
Balagangadhara, S. N. (2009) "Spirituality in Management Theories: A Perspective from India" in S. Nandram & M. Borden (Eds.) Spirituality and Business: Exploring Possibilities for a New Management Paradigm. Heidelberg: Springer, pp. 45–60
Balagangadhara, S. N.; Bloch, Esther, De Roover, Jakob (2008), "Rethinking Colonialism and Colonial Consciousness: The Case of Modern India." in S. Raval (Ed.), Rethinking Forms of Knowledge in India. Delhi: Pencraft International, pp. 179–212.
Balagangadhara, S. N. (2007), "Foreword." In Ramaswamy, de Nicolas & Banerjee (Eds.),  Invading the Sacred: An Analysis of Hinduism Studies in America . Delhi: Rupa & Co., pp. vii–xi.
Balagangadhara, S. N. (2007), "Balagangadhara on the Biblical Underpinnings of 'Secular' Social Sciences." In Ramaswamy, de Nicolas & Banerjee (Eds.), Invading the Sacred: An Analysis of Hinduism Studies in America . Delhi: Rupa & Co., pp. 123–31.
Balagangadhara, S. N. (2007), "India and her Traditions: A Reply to Jeffrey Kripal." In Ramaswamy, de Nicolas & Banerjee (Eds.),  Invading the Sacred: An Analysis of Hinduism Studies in America . Delhi: Rupa & Co., pp. 429–447.
Balagangadhara, S. N. (2006), "Secularisation as the Harbinger of Religious Violence in India: Hybridisation, Hindutva and Post-coloniality." In Schirmer, Saalmann & Kessler (Eds.), Hybridising East and West, Tales Beyond Westernisation. Empirical Contributions to the Debates on Hybridity. Berlin: Lit Verlag, pp. 145–182.
Balagangadhara, S. N. (1991) "The Reality of the Elusive Man?" In Nispen & Tiemersma (Eds.), The Quest of Man: The Topicality of Philosophical Anthropology. Assen: von Gorcum, pp. 112–116
Balagangadhara, S. N. & Pinxten, R. (1989), "Comparative Anthropology and Rhetorics in Cultures". In Maier, Robert (Ed.), Norms in Argumentation. Dordrecht: Foris, pp. 195–211.

Articles

References

External links
Website Research Centre Vergelijkende Cultuurwetenschap
YouTube Channel Rethinking Religion in India
Religioscope on Rethinking Religion in India

1952 births
Ghent University alumni
Academic staff of Ghent University
Belgian Hindus
Living people
Indian Indologists
Hindu philosophers and theologians
20th-century Belgian philosophers
21st-century Belgian philosophers
20th-century Indian philosophers
Scholars from Bangalore